In computer engineering and electrical engineering, bit banging is a "term of art" for any method of data transmission that employs software as a substitute for dedicated hardware to generate transmitted signals or process received signals. Software directly sets and samples the states of GPIOs (e.g., pins on a microcontroller), and is responsible for meeting all timing requirements and protocol sequencing of the signals. In contrast to bit banging, dedicated hardware (e.g., UART, SPI, I²C) satisfies these requirements and, if necessary, provides a data buffer to relax software timing requirements. Bit banging can be implemented at very low cost, and is commonly used in some embedded systems.

Bit banging allows a device to implement different protocols with minimal or no hardware changes. In some cases, bit banging is made feasible by newer, faster processors because more recent hardware operates much more quickly than hardware did when standard communications protocols were created.

C code example

The following C language code example transmits a byte of data on an SPI bus.

// transmit byte serially, MSB first
void send_8bit_serial_data(unsigned char data)
{
   int i;

   // select device (active low)
   output_low(SD_CS);

   // send bits 7..0
   for (i = 0; i < 8; i++)
   {
       // consider leftmost bit
       // set line high if bit is 1, low if bit is 0
       if (data & 0x80)
           output_high(SD_DI);
       else
           output_low(SD_DI);

       // pulse the clock state to indicate that bit value should be read
       output_low(SD_CLK);
       delay();
       output_high(SD_CLK);

       // shift byte left so next bit will be leftmost
       data <<= 1;
   }

   // deselect device
   output_high(SD_CS);
}

Considerations
The question whether to deploy bit banging or not is a trade-off between load, performance and reliability on one hand, and the availability of a hardware alternative on the other. The software emulation process consumes more processing power than does supporting dedicated hardware. The microcontroller spends much of its time sending or receiving samples to and from the pins, at the expense of other tasks. The signal produced usually has more jitter or glitches, especially if the processor is also executing other tasks while communicating. However, if the bit-banging software is interrupt-driven by the signal, this may be of minor importance, especially if control signals such as RTS, CTS, or DCD are available. The implementation in software can be a solution when specific hardware support is not available or requires a more expensive microcontroller.

See also
 Bit manipulation
 Bit stream
 Bit twiddler (disambiguation)
 Bit-serial architecture
 1-bit architecture
 Fast loader
 Integrated Woz Machine (IWM)
 FTDI, a series of USB to serial converter chips also supporting a bit bang mode
 2MGUI (a DOS driver by Ciriaco García de Celis utilizing bit-banging to support non-standard ultra-high capacity floppy disk formats "bypassing" the normal floppy controller logic, a similar program for Amiga floppies is Vincent Joguin's Disk2FDI)
 Virtual machine (VM) (implementing virtual device drivers emulating actual hardware controllers sometimes involves utilizing programming techniques similar to bit banging)
 Software-defined radio (SDR)
 Polling (computer science)

References

External links 
Asynchronous serial (RS-232)
 Notes on bit-banging async serial
 Bit banging for Async Serial Communication
 Bit banging for RS-232

I²C bus
 I2C on AVR using bit banging

SPI bus
 Efficient bit-banged SPI for 8051 microcontroller

Data transmission
Signal processing
Digital circuits
Embedded systems